Rogers Avenue may refer to:

Rogers Avenue (Baltimore)
Rogers Avenue (Metro Subway station), named for Rogers Avenue in Baltimore
Rogers Avenue (Brooklyn); a former railway known as the Rogers Avenue Line had its name
Rogers Avenue (Chicago)
Rogers Avenue (Ellicott City, Maryland)
Rogers Avenue (Fort Smith, Arkansas), the city is the home of Northside High School and Southside High School, who play an annual football game called the Battle of Rogers Avenue